William Greive (1 March 1888 – 17 July 1916) was a Scottish first-class cricketer and British Army soldier.

Greive was born at Howden Farm in Selkirkshire in March 1888 to James Greive, a farmer, and his wife Margaret. He was educated at Selkirk High School. Greive was well known in club cricket in the Scottish Borders region, playing for Selkirk Cricket Club. Considered one of the strongest cricketers in the Scottish Borders, he was selected to play in a first-class match for Scotland against Ireland at Dublin in 1910. He batted twice in the match and was dismissed for scores of 6 and 0 by William Harrington and Gus Kelly respectively. As a bowler he bowled 21 wicket-less overs.

Greive served in the First World War as a lance corporal in the Lothians and Border Horse. He was wounded in action at Siege Farm near Kemmel on 17 July 1916, when a German shell stuck the observers' building which he was in and subsequently set it alight. He was recovered from the burning building, but succumbed to his wounds shortly after. He was buried in the Bailleul Communal Cemetery. Both of his brothers, John and Walter, played first-class cricket; Walter was killed in action in 1917, while John survived the war and later became president of the Scottish Cricket Union.

References

External links

1888 births
1916 deaths
British Army personnel of World War I
British military personnel killed in World War I
Cricketers from Selkirk, Scottish Borders
Lothians and Border Horse soldiers
People educated at Selkirk High School
Scottish cricketers